Cincinnata fasciata is a species of beetle in the family Cerambycidae. It was described by Karl Jordan in 1894. It is known from the Democratic Republic of the Congo, Cameroon, and Gabon.

Varieties
 Cincinnata fasciata var. infasciata Breuning, 1942
 Cincinnata fasciata var. leucothorax Breuning, 1942

References

Crossotini
Beetles described in 1894